

Crown
Head of State - Queen Elizabeth II

Federal government
Governor General - Roméo LeBlanc then Adrienne Clarkson

Cabinet
Prime Minister -  Jean Chrétien
Deputy Prime Minister - Herb Gray
Minister of Finance - Paul Martin
Minister of Foreign Affairs - Lloyd Axworthy
Minister of National Defence - Art Eggleton
Minister of Health - Allan Rock
Minister of Industry - John Manley
Minister of Heritage - Sheila Copps
Minister of Intergovernmental Affairs - Stéphane Dion
Minister of the Environment - Christine Stewart then David Anderson
Minister of Justice - Anne McLellan
Minister of Transport - David Collenette
Minister of Citizenship and Immigration - Lucienne Robillard then Elinor Caplan
Minister of Fisheries and Oceans - David Anderson then Herb Dhaliwal
Minister of Agriculture and Agri-Food - Lyle Vanclief
Minister of Public Works and Government Services - Alfonso Gagliano
Minister of Human Resources Development - Pierre Pettigrew then Jane Stewart
Minister of Natural Resources - Ralph Goodale

Members of Parliament
See: 36th Canadian parliament

Party leaders
Liberal Party of Canada -  Jean Chrétien
Bloc Québécois - Gilles Duceppe
New Democratic Party- Alexa McDonough
Progressive Conservative Party of Canada - Joe Clark
Reform Party of Canada - Preston Manning

Supreme Court Justices
Chief Justice: Antonio Lamer
Beverley McLachlin
Frank Iacobucci
John C. Major
Michel Bastarache
William Ian Corneil Binnie
Peter deCarteret Cory then Louise Arbour
Claire L'Heureux-Dubé
Charles D. Gonthier

Other
Speaker of the House of Commons - Gilbert Parent
Governor of the Bank of Canada - Gordon Thiessen
Chief of the Defence Staff - General Maurice Baril

Provinces

Premiers
Premier of Alberta - Ralph Klein
Premier of British Columbia - Glen Clark then Dan Miller
Premier of Manitoba - Gary Filmon then Gary Doer
Premier of New Brunswick - Camille Thériault then Bernard Lord
Premier of Newfoundland - Brian Tobin
Premier of Nova Scotia - Russell MacLellan then John Hamm
Premier of Ontario - Mike Harris
Premier of Prince Edward Island - Pat Binns
Premier of Quebec - Lucien Bouchard
Premier of Saskatchewan - Roy Romanow
Premier of the Northwest Territories - James Antoine
Premier of Nunavut - Paul Okalik (territory formed on April 1)
Premier of Yukon - Piers McDonald

Lieutenant-governors
Lieutenant-Governor of Alberta - Bud Olson
Lieutenant-Governor of British Columbia - Garde Gardom
Lieutenant-Governor of Manitoba - Yvon Dumont then Peter Liba
Lieutenant-Governor of New Brunswick - Marilyn Trenholme Counsell
Lieutenant-Governor of Newfoundland and Labrador - Arthur Maxwell House
Lieutenant-Governor of Nova Scotia - James Kinley
Lieutenant-Governor of Ontario - Hilary Weston
Lieutenant-Governor of Prince Edward Island - Gilbert Clements
Lieutenant-Governor of Quebec - Lise Thibault
Lieutenant-Governor of Saskatchewan - Jack Wiebe

Mayors
Toronto - Mel Lastman
Montreal - Pierre Bourque
Vancouver - Philip Owen
Ottawa - Jim Watson
Victoria - Bob Cross then Alan Lowe

Religious Leaders
Roman Catholic Bishop of Quebec -  Archbishop Maurice Couture
Roman Catholic Bishop of Montreal -  Cardinal Archbishop Jean-Claude Turcotte
Roman Catholic Bishops of London - Bishop John Michael Sherlock
Moderator of the United Church of Canada - Bill Phipps

See also
1998 Canadian incumbents
Events in Canada in 1999
2000 Canadian incumbents
Governmental leaders in 1999
Canadian incumbents by year

1999
Incumbents
incumbents
Canadian leaders